John Williams House may refer to:

John C. Williams House, St. Petersburg, Florida, listed on the NRHP in Florida
John Williams House (Shawhan, Kentucky), listed on the NRHP in Harrison County, Kentucky
John Williams House (Mount Vernon, Maine), listed on the NRHP in Kennebec County, Maine
John Siddle Williams House, Hermitage, Missouri, listed on the NRHP in Hickory County, Missouri
John and Ann Williams House, Stevensville, Montana, listed on the NRHP in Ravalli County, Montana
John S. Williams House and Farm, Chatham, New York, listed on the NRHP in New York
John Williams Farm, Phoenixville, Pennsylvania, listed on the NRHP in Eastern Chester County, Pennsylvania
John Williams House (Williams Grove, Pennsylvania), listed on the NRHP in Cumberland County, Pennsylvania
John and Kittie Williams House, Webster, South Dakota, listed on the NRHP in Day County, South Dakota
John Williams House (Savannah, Georgia), built in 1849

See also
Williams House (disambiguation)